Ermir Zyber Rezi (born 12 May 1994) is an Albanian professional footballer who plays as a secondary striker for Albanian club Erzeni Shijak in the Albanian First Division.

Club career

Early career
Began his career with KF Tirana at the age of 13 in 2007, where he would travel from his hometown Maminas in Durrës to Tirana for training under former Albanian international footballer Skënder Hodja. At the age of 15 he enrolled at the national sports school Bernardina Qerraxhia, where the school's football team was Shkëndija Durrës. As he had done at KF Tirana, he competed with age group two years older than himself, meaning he joined the under-17 team at Shkëndija, where he scored 19 goals before progressing to the under-19 side.

He became the best goalscorer in Albania at under-19 level, scoring 36 goals in 29 games to help his team finish 6th in the U-19 championship. The following season, he scored 7 goals in the first half of the campaign before transferring to the club he supported throughout his life, Teuta Durrës. During his time with Shkëndija he scored 62 goals in 65 games for both the U-17s and U-19s. At Teuta he initially joined the under-19s and scored 13 goals in the second half of the season and narrowly missed out on the national U-19 championship to Shkëndija Tiranë.

Teuta Durrës
He made his senior professional debut in an Albanian Cup match against Laçi on 20 February 2013, shortly after joining the club and scoring on his debut with the under-19s. On his debut he came on as a 55th-minute substitute for Alfred Deliallisi in the 1–0 win for his side. He made his first Albanian Superliga appearance once again in a 1–0 home win over Laçi, on 3 May 2013, coming on in the 76th minute for Ansi Nika.

He made 1 league appearance and 4 Albanian Cup appearances in the first half of the season before being loaned out to Albanian First Division side Elbasani in January 2014 for the remainder of the 2013–14 campaign. He made 9 league appearances, 6 of those from the starting lineup, as Elbasani won the First Division and achieved promotion to the Albanian Superliga.

Dinamo Tirana
On 2 September 2014, Rezi completed a transfer to fellow First Division side Dinamo Tirana by penning a one-year contract. He played his first match for the new club in the opening matchday against Luftëtari Gjirokastër, contributing with a goal in the injury time in an eventual 2–0 away win. He made 22 appearances throughout the year, scoring two goals, as Dinamo finished 6th in Group B. He left the club once his contract run out.

International career

Albania U20
Rezi was called up at Albania national under-20 football team by coach Skënder Gega to participate in the 2013 Mediterranean Games football tournament which began on 19 June 2013 in Mersin, Turkey. Rezi played in 4 out 5 Albania U20s matches in which 3 of them were full 90-minutes and 1 as a substitute. Albania U20 was ranked in the last place out of 8 teams.

Albania U21
Rezi debuted with Albania national under-21 football team on 6 May 2014 against Italy U21 under the coach Skënder Gega coming on as a substitute in the 51st minute in place of Maldin Ymeraj as the match ended in the 1–0 loss.

Career statistics

Club

Honours

Club
Elbasani
Albanian First Division: 2013–14

Kamza
Albanian First Division: 2016–17

Individual
Albania Championship U-19 top scorer: 2011-12

References

External links

FSHF profile

1994 births
Living people
Footballers from Durrës
Albanian footballers
Association football forwards
Association football midfielders
Albania youth international footballers
Albania under-21 international footballers
KF Teuta Durrës players
KF Elbasani players
FK Dinamo Tirana players
KF Erzeni players
FC Kamza players
Kategoria Superiore players
Kategoria e Parë players
Competitors at the 2013 Mediterranean Games
Mediterranean Games competitors for Albania